The 2022 Big Ten Football Championship Game was a college football game that was played on December 3, 2022, at Lucas Oil Stadium in Indianapolis, Indiana. It was 12th edition of the Big Ten Football Championship Game and determined the champion of the conference for the 2022 season. The game began at 8:00 p.m. EST and aired on Fox. The game featured the Purdue Boilermakers, the West Division champions, and the No. 2 Michigan Wolverines, the East Division champions.

Teams

Purdue Boilermakers

Entering the final week of the regular season, Iowa, Purdue, and Illinois were in contention for the West division title. Iowa would have been able to clinch with a win, but was upset by Nebraska, giving Purdue the opportunity to clinch the berth with a win. Purdue beat in-state rivals Indiana 30–16 to clinch the division title and their first Big Ten Championship Game appearance in program history.

Michigan Wolverines

Entering the final week of the regular season, Michigan and Ohio State both had undefeated conference records at 8–0 going into the 2022 edition of The Game in Columbus, thus making the game a de facto East division championship. Michigan won the game 45–23, outscoring the Buckeyes 28–3 in the second half, and clinched the division title for the second consecutive season.

Game summary

Statistics
Team statistics

See also
 List of Big Ten Conference football champions

References

Championship
Big Ten Football Championship Game
Michigan Wolverines football games
Purdue Boilermakers football games
Big Ten Football Championship Game
Big Ten Football Champ
2020s in Indianapolis